Yvonne Enakhena is a Nigerian actress and film producer.

Education
Enakhena holds a degree in Theatre and Media Arts from University of Lagos.

Career
On her career path she claimed to be sexually harassed when seeking a role, Yvonne Enakhena started acting in 2012. She got popular for her character role in the series Hotel Majestic. In 2017, she produced her own movie titled Trace.

Filmography
Trace
Hotel Majestic
Aaron My Son
Ojuju

Awards and nominations

See also
List of Nigerian film producers
List of Nigerian actors

References

External links

Nigerian film actresses
Living people
21st-century Nigerian actresses
Nigerian women film producers
University of Lagos alumni
Nigerian film producers
Year of birth missing (living people)